James Jessen Badal (born 1943) is an American true crime writer.

He is also an assistant professor in English language and journalism at Cuyahoga Community College. His true crime works include a book about the disappearance of Beverly Potts and three books about the Cleveland Torso Murders case. According to his first book about the latter, In the Wake of the Butcher, he took an interest in the case while still in elementary school, when his teacher of history in the 8th grade gave his class a two-day lecture about the murders. As of 2014, he is working on a book about the unsolved murder of 16-year-old Beverly Jarosz, committed in Garfield Heights, Ohio in 1964.

Badal resides in Cleveland, Ohio.

Bibliography 
 Recording the Classics: Maestros, Music, and Technology (1996)
 In the Wake of the Butcher: Cleveland's Torso Murders (2001)
 Twilight of Innocence: The Disappearance of Beverly Potts (2005)
 Though Murder Has No Tongue: The Lost Victim of Cleveland’s Mad Butcher (2010)
 Hell’s Wasteland: The Pennsylvania Torso Murders (2013)

References 

1943 births
Living people
American non-fiction crime writers
Writers from Cleveland
Educators from Ohio
20th-century American educators
21st-century American educators